Medin or MEDIN may refer to
Medin (name)
 the Marine Environmental Data and Information Network
 Medin, a district of Damascus: possibly this is Al-Midan?
 Medin, a district of Kaluga
 Medin, an amyloidogenic fragment derived from lactadherin
 MedinTux, a free healthcare software